Myriopteris clevelandii, formerly known as Cheilanthes clevelandii, is a species of lip fern known by the common name Cleveland's lip fern. It is native to southern California and Baja California in Mexico. The leaf is divided into small, bead-like segments densely covered with scales beneath. In M. clevelandii, some of these scales are reduced to hairlike structures, which help distinguish it from the closely related M. covillei. It is usually found growing on exposed rock, particularly igneous rock.

Description
The leaves are closely or broadly spaced along them. The rhizome bears persistent linear-lanceolate scales, which are dark brown or brown to red-brown in color and shiny. The scales may be of a uniform brown color, or bear a dark central stripe with paler edges. The margins of the scales are entire or erose to slightly toothed with teeth well-spaced. The scales are straight or slightly twisted and strongly appressed (pressed against the rhizome).

The fronds arise from the rhizome in clusters or as somewhat scattered individual leaves. Unlike many ferns, they do not emerge as coiled fiddleheads (noncircinate vernation). The stipe is shiny, rounded, and dark to light brown, covered with -long hairs and filiform (threadlike) scales that are gray to red-brown in color. The covering is lost as the frond ages.

The leaf blades are oblong-lanceolate to ovate and tetrapinnate (cut into pinnae, pinnules, pinnulets, and divisions of pinnulets) at the base. The rachis (leaf axis) is rounded, rather than grooved, on its upper surface, and there is no distinct joint where the pinnae attach to the rachis, the dark color of the latter continuing into the base of the costa (pinna axis). 10 to 12 pairs of pinnae are present in Mexican specimens, somewhat more in some Californian material. Each pinna is equilateral in shape, and the lowest pair of pinnae is not significantly enlarged compared to the others. The upper surface of the costae is green along much of their length. The lower surface of the costae is covered in conspicuous broad scales. These are ovate-lanceolate to broadly deltate in shape, and deeply cordate (notched at the base to appear heart-shaped). Those closer to the base of the costa are ciliate. The upper surface of the leaf is glabrous (free of hairs). The lower surface of the leaf is covered in ciliate scales, similar to those of the costa but reduced in width so as to appear like branched hairs in some cases, more or less concealing the surface.

On fertile fronds, the sori are protected by false indusia formed by the edge of the leaf curling strongly back over the underside, often concealing the sori. The recurved edges are only a little modified in comparison to the rest of the leaf tissue. The sori contain brown spores, with 64 spores in each sporangium.

Specimens from some of the northern Channel Islands are larger, with more dissected scales, and have been referred to as "var. clokeyi", but this name has never been formally published. M. clevelandii is quite similar to M. covillei, usually found more inland. In the latter, the reduced, hairlike scales are not present on the abaxial surface of the leaf tissue, while the scales on the abaxial surface of the costa are larger and lack cilia except on their basal lobes.

Taxonomy
The species was first described in 1875 by Daniel Cady Eaton as Cheilanthes clevelandii. He named it for Daniel Cleveland, the collector of the type specimen, which came from "a mountain about forty miles from San Diego, California". By a strict application of the principle of priority, Oliver Atkins Farwell transferred the species to the genus Allosorus as Allosorus myriophyllus var. clevelandii in 1931, that genus having been published before Cheilanthes. Farwell's name was rendered unnecessary when Cheilanthes was conserved over Allosorus in the Paris Code published in 1956.

The development of molecular phylogenetic methods showed that the traditional circumscription of Cheilanthes is polyphyletic. Convergent evolution in arid environments is thought to be responsible for widespread homoplasy in the morphological characters traditionally used to classify it and the segregate genera that have sometimes been recognized. On the basis of molecular evidence, Amanda Grusz and Michael D. Windham revived the genus Myriopteris in 2013 for a group of species formerly placed in Cheilanthes. One of these was C. clevelandii, which thus became Myriopteris clevelandii. In 2018, Maarten J. M. Christenhusz transferred the species to Hemionitis as H. clevelandii, as part of a program to consolidate the cheilanthoid ferns into that genus.

Further molecular studies in Myriopteris demonstrated the existence of three well-supported clades within the genus. M. clevelandii belongs to what Grusz et al. informally named the covillei clade. Members of the  "core covillei" clade, including M. clevelandii, have leaves finely divided into bead-like segments. Within this clade, M. clevelandii is sister to M. covillei.

Distribution and habitat
The fern is native to southern California, specifically the Peninsular Ranges and several of the northern Channel Islands, and to northern Baja California, Mexico.

It is found in a variety of rocky, exposed habitats, including chaparral, on slopes and ledges, or at the bases of boulders and in crevices. It usually prefers igneous rocks.

Conservation and ecology
Myriopteris clevelandii is classified as globally vulnerable by NatureServe. It faces few distinct threats, but its natural range is limited.

Notes and references

References

Works cited

External links
Image of the holotype of the species
UC Photos gallery — Cheilanthes clevelandii

clevelandii
Ferns of California
Ferns of Mexico
Flora of Baja California
Natural history of the California chaparral and woodlands
Natural history of the Channel Islands of California
Natural history of the Peninsular Ranges
Plants described in 1875